St. Anthony's School is a Catholic preparatory school in Hampstead, London, for boys aged 4 to 13. There is also an associated nursery for children from the age of 2.5 to 4 which is housed in St Anthony's School for Girls, the sister school to St Anthony's school for Boys on North End Road.

History 
St. Anthony's was founded in Eastbourne in 1898 by the Patton family. It moved to its current location in Hampstead, London shortly after World War II. In 2010, it was taken over by the Alpha Plus Group, who installed Paul Keyte as the headmaster.

Campus 
The school occupies a pair of large houses at 90 Fitzjohn's Ave and 1 Arkwright Rd in Hampstead, north London. It is part of a cluster of schools in the vicinity that includes Devonshire House, North Bridge House and Fitzjohn's Primary.

Curriculum 
The curriculum is based on Roman Catholic teaching. In addition to the core subjects of English, Mathematics, Science and ICT the following subjects are taught from Year 1: French, Mandarin, R.S., Latin, History, Geography, Art, Design Technology. Robotics has also been introduced into the curriculum.

Extracurricular activities 
In addition to the impressive music provision with over 12 visiting teachers providing individual instrumental lessons, the school also offers digital music composition, a jazz band and numerous orchestras and choirs, Coding, Chess, Arts and Crafts, LAMDA, swimming, (with an enviable pool on site),rugby, cricket, hockey, football, tennis and many more. The children are also given public speaking experience via an excellent debating club.School masses are held once a term at St Mary's Church, Hampstead.  Regular concerts by visiting musicians, talks by authors, university professors and other professionals who speak regularly to the boys on a wide range of topics are also held at school to further encourage a wider learning experience.

Awards and recognition 
In 2019 the school was rated "excellent" in all areas by the Independent Schools Inspectorate

Alumni 
An old boys' association has been started.

References

External links 
 
Profile on the ISC website

Private schools in the London Borough of Camden
Preparatory schools in London
Private boys' schools in London
Roman Catholic private schools in the Archdiocese of Westminster
Schools in Hampstead